Christine Pirès-Beaune, born 6 October 1964 in Saint-Georges-de-Mons (Puy-de-Dôme), is a French politician,  a member of the Socialist Party. She has been deputy for the second constituency of Puy-de-Dôme since June 2012.

Biography
Christine Pirès-Beaune's parents emigrated from Portugal to France in 1960. Her father was a metal worker, at Aubert & Duval, in Ancizes.

Christine Pires Beaune worked at the planning and development union of Combrailles with Jean Michel and Claude Passavy. From 1998 to 2004, she was chief of staff to Pierre-Joël Bonté, the president of the Puy-de-Dôme General Council. In 2004, Pierre-Joël Bonté was elected president of the Regional Council of Auvergne and Christine Pirès-Beaune remained his chief of staff.

On the death of Pierre-Joël Bonté, in January 2006, Pirès-Beaune became director of financial services for the city of Riom, then general director of city services in 2010.

She ran for election for the first time on the socialist list in Volvic in 2008. The socialist list was defeated but Christine Pires Beaune was elected to the municipal council.

National Assembly
Pires-Beaune was the socialist candidate for Puy-de-Dôme's 2nd constituency in the 2012 French legislative election.  This constituency was the result of the merging of the previous 2nd constituency with the 6th constituency, which was abolished in the 2010 redistricting of French legislative constituencies.
She led the first round with 38.8% of the vote, and won the second round with 59.5%.

She sits on the Finance Committee of the National Assembly. She is Special Rapporteur of the Finance Committee responsible for relations with local authorities.

In 2017, she participated in the preparation of the White Paper on prison real estate under the chairmanship of Jean-René Lecerf.

In the 2017 French legislative election, despite trailing Mohand Hamoumou of La République En Marche! by 1.6% in the first round, she was easily re-elected with 63.21% of the votes in the second round.

Notes

External links
 Her page on the site of the National Assembly

References

Deputies of the 14th National Assembly of the French Fifth Republic
Deputies of the 15th National Assembly of the French Fifth Republic
Living people
1964 births
21st-century French women politicians
Deputies of the 16th National Assembly of the French Fifth Republic
Socialist Party (France) politicians
French people of Portuguese descent